Jeromy Theodore Miles (born July 20, 1987) is a former American football safety. He was signed by the Cincinnati Bengals as an undrafted free agent in 2010. He played college football at Massachusetts.

Professional career

Cincinnati Bengals
After going undrafted in the 2010 NFL Draft, Miles signed with the Cincinnati Bengals as an undrafted free agent on April 30, 2010. He was cut on September 4, 2010. He was re-signed to the practice squad the next day. He was promoted to the active roster on November 24, 2010.

The Bengals offered a one-year tender to Miles on March 13, 2012.

Set to become a free agent in 2013, Miles was offered another one-year tender, which he signed on April 15, 2013. He was released on September 21, 2013.

Baltimore Ravens
On September 23, 2013, Miles was claimed off waivers by the Baltimore Ravens. He mostly contributed on special teams for the Ravens finishing his season with 10 total tackles.

Miles re-signed with the Ravens to a one-year contract on March 13, 2014.

Miles recorded his first career interception on December 14, 2014.

New York Giants
On July 15, 2015, it was reported that Miles signed a one-year deal with the New York Giants. On September 5, 2015, he was cut by the Giants.

References

External links
Baltimore Ravens bio
Cincinnati Bengals bio
UMass Minutemen bio
ESPN.com bio

1987 births
Living people
Sportspeople from Camden County, New Jersey
Winslow Township High School alumni
Players of American football from New Jersey
American football safeties
UMass Minutemen football players
Cincinnati Bengals players
Baltimore Ravens players
New York Giants players